Varjavi (also Romanized as Varjavī and Varjovī) is a village in Qareh Naz Rural District, in the Central District of Maragheh County, East Azerbaijan Province, Iran. At the 2006 census, its population was 3,168, in 853 families.

References 

Towns and villages in Maragheh County